The Vast of Night is a 2019 American science fiction mystery film directed by Andrew Patterson. It was co-produced and written by Patterson (under the pseudonym James Montague) and Craig W. Sanger. The story takes place in 1950s New Mexico and is loosely based on the Kecksburg UFO incident and Foss Lake disappearances. The film follows young switchboard operator Fay Crocker (Sierra McCormick) and radio disc jockey Everett Sloan (Jake Horowitz) as they discover a mysterious audio frequency that could be extraterrestrial in origin.

The Vast of Night premiered at the Slamdance Film Festival in January 2019. Amazon Studios acquired the distribution rights and released it on May 29, 2020 in drive-in theaters in the United States and via video-on-demand on Amazon Prime Video. The film received critical acclaim from critics, who particularly praised the direction, cinematography, and historical authenticity, as well as the performances of McCormick and Horowitz. At the 1st Critics' Choice Super Awards in 2021, the film received three nominations and several other accolades.

Plot

In 1950s Cayuga, New Mexico, teenage disc jockey Everett helps prepare for a high school basketball game. He and his friend Fay test out her new tape recorder, and Everett walks her to her job as a switchboard operator before starting his own night shift at the WOTW radio station. Fay listens to Everett's show, which is interrupted by a mysterious audio signal. Fielding calls about a strange wind-like phenomenon from the sky, she hears the same signal over the phone line; her connections drop when she calls friends about the signal. Fay calls Everett, who asks his listeners for information about the signal, which he broadcasts on the air.

A man named Billy calls, and Everett broadcasts him live. Billy explains that he served in the military and was flown to a highly secretive location in the desert. Warned that telling anyone about the classified project would "endanger America", he and the other personnel built a large underground bunker to house an enormous unknown object. Flying away from the facility, he heard the same unexplained signal on the plane's radio. Billy developed a lung condition that he believes was caused by his time in the desert and learned of other instances of the military burying similar cargo in secret locations, where the same signal was heard. He explains that the sound appears to be a communication signal, sometimes transmitted higher than any man-made object could fly.

The call is briefly disconnected, but Billy calls back and reveals that he and the other personnel chosen for these projects were all black or Mexican, to ensure they were less likely to be believed by the public. A friend of his managed to record the signal and sent copies to Billy and others who worked on the projects; one tape was given to a member of the Air Force in Cayuga, now deceased. Fay realizes that his tapes were given to the local library and steals them. Billy is disconnected, and Everett and Fay find the recording of the signal and broadcast it, but the radio station's power is knocked out. They race to the switchboard office, where Fay receives numerous reports of "something in the sky", and they meet Gerald and Bertsie, who have been driving in pursuit of the same unidentified flying object. An elderly woman named Mabel calls and offers to provide more information about the signal.

Everett and Fay go to Mabel's home, where they find her reciting a message in an unknown language. With Everett recording their conversation, Mabel claims that the phenomena seen across town are spaceships, piloted by aliens who use their message to hypnotize and abduct humans. She believes the aliens will target isolated people while most of the town is at the basketball game and suspects the aliens are responsible for sowing conflict in humanity, from alcoholism to war. Mabel asks to be taken to the alien ship to reunite with her son, who was abducted years ago. Unconvinced, Everett leaves with Fay, who collects her baby sister Maddie. They are soon picked up by Gerald and Bertsie. Everett plays the recording of Mabel reciting the alien message, sending Gerald and Bertsie into a trance and nearly causing them to crash. After the eerie incident, Everett and Fay panic and flee with Maddie into the woods.

Making their way through the woods, they find trees and branches that have been charred, and spot a large opening overhead as though an object has crashed through. Everett cautiously acknowledges the aliens are real and may be lurking nearby, which sends him and Fay running until they come to a clearing. The two take a moment to catch their breath, but they see the truth when they lay eyes on a flying saucer hovering nearby. They watch in awe as the spacecraft rejoins a massive mothership in the sky, and the wind begins swirling around them. Elsewhere the crowd leaves the basketball game, but Everett, Fay, and Maddie are gone. Only their footprints and tape recorder remain.

Cast
 Sierra McCormick as Fay Crocker
 Jake Horowitz as Everett Sloan
 Gail Cronauer as Mabel Blanche
 Bruce Davis as Billy
 Greg Peyton as Benny
 Mark Banik as Gerald

Production
According to the director Andrew Patterson, the film came out of one of the ideas he had in the previous decade, which simply said: "1950s black and white. New Mexico, UFO landing." Patterson wrote the script with Craig W. Sanger, although he registered the script with the WGA under the pseudonym James Montague, who is also listed as the producer. Patterson also financed the film himself with earnings from his work producing commercials and shorts for the Oklahoma City Thunder and others. It was filmed in three to four weeks at a cost of $700,000.

The film was shot mostly in Whitney, Texas, during the fall of 2016, starting in September. The town was selected after looking through many towns to find one with the right gymnasium. In order to get the period details correct, the production team removed the three-point line of the basketball court in the gym at a cost of $20,000, and they found functional switchboards which were used at that time. The cinematographer for the film was M.I. Littin-Menz. Patterson spent a year editing the film.

Release
The film premiered at the 2019 Slamdance Film Festival and went on to screen at several other film festivals. Amazon Studios acquired the movie in September 2019, and the trailer was released on February 6, 2020. The film was released in drive-in cinemas nationally on May 15, 2020, and on Amazon Prime on May 29.

Reception

Critical response 
The site's critics consensus reads: "An engrossing sci-fi thriller that transcends its period trappings, The Vast of Night suggests great things for debuting director Andrew Patterson." Metacritic assigned the film a weighted average score of 84 out of 100, based on 35 critics, indicating "universal acclaim".

David Fear of Rolling Stone called the film an "ingenious debut from director Andrew Patterson." Katie Rife of The A.V. Club wrote that it "manages to be eerie and compelling" and "despite its intergalactic scope, this is an intimate, character-driven film." Amy Taubin of Film Comment called it "a display of visionary moviemaking intelligence," comparing it to first features by directors such as Richard Kelly and Christopher Nolan. Meg Shields of Film School Rejects commended the sound design as "inescapable and essential" and M.I. Littin-Menz's camerawork as "simply amazing." Varietys Amy Nicholson praised the film as charming and inventive, writing, "At the midpoint, Patterson wows with a tracking shot that seems to race a half-mile down a quiet street, take a left-hook through a parking lot, sprint through an ongoing basketball game, and zip up the crowded bleachers before plunging out of a window. It's effective razzle-dazzle that will probably get the young Oklahoman hired to make something 20 times The Vast of Nights budget. Yet, the ambition behind it is just as impressive — as is the crew’s creativity at spinning financial limitations into magic."

Writing for IndieWire, Ryan Lattanzio stated that "None of this would work without Horowitz and McCormick’s performances, which already feel iconic." In Forbes, Christopher Orr wrote, "Patterson’s young leads, McCormick and Horowitz, are both exceptional, the former offering an indelible portrait of the intrepid good-girl, and the latter recalling a young Christian Slater with his mesmerizing patter, half-cool, half-nerd." Josh Weiss, also writing in Forbes, said "The Vast of Night might have collapsed under the weight of its own ambitions, had it not been for its two electrifying leads. Horowitz is an absolute revelation, especially since this is his first time as a leading cast member. He brings Everett, who always seems to have a cigarette dangling from his lips, to vivid life with a boatload of charisma and an unparalleled sense of cool that channels American’ Graffiti’s John Milner or Dazed and Confused’s David Wooderson." Jacob Oller of Paste listed the performance of McCormick on "The 10 Breakout Film Performances of the Year", where they particularly praised her work in "the ten-minute scene, done in a single take, involving McCormick operating a switchboard trying to find out what has gone wrong in the sci-fi film’s desert town... It’s just McCormick out there, exposed, carrying the film for an unbroken ten minutes. It’s Olympic-level acting and she nails it, finding the exact tempo with which to pace her escalating concern."

Awards and nominations 
At the 2019 Slamdance Film Festival, it won the Audience Award for Best Narrative Feature. At the 2019 Toronto International Film Festival, it was named first runner-up for the People's Choice Award in the Midnight Madness category. It won the Grand Jury Prize at the 2019 Overlook Film Festival and a Special Cinematography Award at the 2019 Hamptons International Film Festival, and was nominated for Best First Screenplay at the Independent Spirit Awards and Best International Feature film at the 2019 Edinburgh International Film Festival. At the 2021 Critics' Choice Super Awards, it received three nominations for Best Science Fiction/Fantasy Movie, and Best Actor and Actress in a Science Fiction/Fantasy Movie for Horowitz and McCormick, respectively.

Notes

References

External links
 
 
 
 

2019 directorial debut films
2019 films
2019 thriller films
2010s science fiction thriller films
2019 independent films
Amazon Studios films
American science fiction thriller films
Films about extraterrestrial life
Films about radio people
Films set in New Mexico
Films set in the 1950s
Films shot in Texas
Amazon Prime Video original films
2010s English-language films
2010s American films